Lyudmila Leonidova Arzhannikova (born 15 March 1958 in Kamianske) is an Olympic archer. She competed for the Soviet Union at the 1988 Summer Olympics IV individuel and IV with team, for the Unified Team at the 1992 Summer Olympics, and for the Netherlands at the 1996 Summer Olympics 1/8 finale.

References

External links
 https://worldarchery.org/fr/athlete/7606/liudmila-arzhannikova
 http://worldinsidetheshot.com/

1958 births
Living people
Soviet female archers
Ukrainian female archers
Dutch female archers
Archers at the 1988 Summer Olympics
Archers at the 1992 Summer Olympics
Archers at the 1996 Summer Olympics
Olympic archers of the Soviet Union
Olympic archers of the Unified Team
Olympic archers of the Netherlands
Olympic bronze medalists for the Unified Team
Olympic medalists in archery
People from Kamianske
Medalists at the 1992 Summer Olympics
Ukrainian emigrants to the Netherlands
Lviv State University of Physical Culture alumni
Sportspeople from Dnipropetrovsk Oblast